Route 213 or Highway 213 can refer to:

Canada
 Manitoba Provincial Road 213
 Newfoundland and Labrador Route 213
 Nova Scotia Route 213
 Prince Edward Island Route 213
 Quebec Route 213

China
 China National Highway 213

Costa Rica
 National Route 213

Ireland
 R213 regional road

Japan
 Japan National Route 213

United States
 U.S. Route 213 (former)
 Alabama State Route 213
 California State Route 213
 Connecticut Route 213
Florida State Road 213 (former)
 Georgia State Route 213 (former)
 Illinois Route 213 (former)
 Kentucky Route 213
 Maine State Route 213
 Maryland Route 213
 Massachusetts Route 213
 M-213 (Michigan highway) (former)
 Missouri Route 213
 Montana Secondary Highway 213
 New Mexico State Road 213
 New York State Route 213
 North Carolina Highway 213
 Ohio State Route 213
 Oregon Route 213
 Pennsylvania Route 213
 South Carolina Highway 213
 Tennessee State Route 213
 Texas State Highway 213
 Texas State Highway Loop 213
 Texas State Highway Spur 213
 Utah State Route 213 (former)
 Virginia State Route 213
 Washington State Route 213 (unbuilt)
 Wisconsin Highway 213
 Wyoming Highway 213